Majeed Ashimeru (born 10 October 1997) is a Ghanaian professional footballer who plays as a midfielder for Belgian Pro League club Anderlecht and the Ghana national team.

Club career
He Began His Football Career From A small Club Team Which Is Strong Tower F/C(Mamobi)He made his First Capital Plus Premier League debut for West African Football Academy on 20 March 2016 in a game against Liberty Professionals F.C. From there he got the chance to fly to Austria to join RedBull Salzburg where he signed his first professional contract.

International
He made his debut for the Ghana national football team on 25 May 2017 in a friendly against Benin. Ashimeru always considers his UEFA debut as one of his proudest moment. He was introduced in the game as a second-half substitute for Red Bull Salzburg when they played Liverpool on 2 October 2019 at Anfield

Career statistics

Honours 
Red Bull Salzburg

 Austrian Bundesliga: 2019–20
 Austrian Cup: 2019–20

References

External links
 
 

1997 births
Living people
Ghanaian footballers
Ghanaian Muslims
West African Football Academy players
Ghana international footballers
Ghanaian expatriate footballers
Expatriate footballers in Austria
Expatriate footballers in Switzerland
FC Red Bull Salzburg players
SC Austria Lustenau players
Wolfsberger AC players
FC St. Gallen players
Austrian Football Bundesliga players
2. Liga (Austria) players
Swiss Super League players
Association football midfielders